The U-12 Junior Soccer World Challenge(U-12ジュニアサッカーワールドチャレンジ) is a football tournament for players age 12 or younger in Tokyo, Japan organized by Amazing Sports Lab Japan, Inc. and Tokyo Football Association(2013 - 2017), Osaka Football Association(2018 -).

History 

The first year of the tournament in 2013. 12 teams took place for 4 days, from 27 to 31 August. The final match was FC Barcelona against Liverpool FC, and FC Barcelona was the first year’s champion.

The second year of the tournament had more participants, in total, 16 teams took part. Not only Football club FC Barcelona and A.C. Milan, the 2 big European clubs took place, but also Asiop Apacinti from Indonesia came to the tournament. From Japan, some youth category teams from J-League’s club, and a small regional club came to play this tournament. The tournament was held from 28 to 31 August, and the winner was FC Barcelona.

The 3rd tournament in 2015 invited FC Barcelona and RCD Espanyol from Spain, Deportivo Camioneros from Argentine, and Vietnam U-12 from Asia. The tournament was held from 27th to 30 August. One of the semi-finals match was played between FC Barcelona and Tokyo U-12, and FC Barcelona, who was the champions for 2 consecutive years, was defeated by Tokyo U-12. The final was played between Tokyo U-12 and RCD Espanyol, after 90 min., the match has ended draw. And they ended up with the penalty shoot-out, finally, RCD Espanyol won the trophy.

Regulations 

 The tournament will be played in accordance with the regulations of Japan Football Association. (Regulations will be the new one)
 Match balls will be size 4.
 The tournament will be 11v11.
 The clubs play the group matches, and 8 best teams go to the play off. (Direct elimination)
 Every match will be made up of two halves of 25 minutes. With 5 minutes break. (During the playing periods include substitutions and drink water).
 The play off of the group matches will be 2 halves of 20 minutes.
 The semifinal, third place play off　and final match´s break will be 10 min.
 In case of tied match, during the group matches will be finished as tied match, and play-off will play penalty kicks.  (3 penalties)

Qualifying round 
Qualifying J-League youth academies has been carried out from 2016 because the clubs wish to participate in the tournament has increased. Six teams from 15 teams that participated in the East Japan qualifying and three teams from the seven teams that participated in the West Japan qualifying has competed in this 2016 tournament.

Results

Awards

Most Valuable Player 
 2013 Eric García (FC Barcelona)
 2014 Pablo Moreno (FC Barcelona)
 2015 Yuki Nagata  (Tokyo U-12)
 2016 Adriá Capdevila Puigmal (FC Barcelona)
 2017 Marc Bombardo Poyato (FC Barcelona)
 2018 Myles Lewis-Skelly (Arsenal F.C.)

Best Scorer 
 2013 Ansu Fati (FC Barcelona), Paul Glatzel ( Liverpool FC)
 2014 Tomoya Osawa (Omiya Ardija Junior)
 2015 Pelaz Ruiz Marc (FC Barcelona)
 2016 Takumi Minamino (Gamba Osaka Junior)
 2017 Kouhei Terasawa (Tokyo U-12)  Yu Imanishi (Gamba Osaka Junior)  Hisatsugu Ishii (Fukuyama Rosas Seleson)
 2018  (Nagoya Grampus U-12)

Squads from Outside Japan 
 2013 FC Barcelona Liverpool F.C. Chonburi F.C.
 2014 FC Barcelona A.C. Milan  Asiop Apacinti
 2015 FC Barcelona RCD Espanyol  Deportivo Camioneros Vietnam U-12
 2016 FC Barcelona Manchester City F.C.
 2017 FC Barcelona Arsenal F.C.
 2018 FC Barcelona Arsenal F.C. Club Tijuana  Chinese Football Association Select  R&F Soccer School Select
 2019 FC Barcelona FC Bayern München Nigeria Select Guangzhou Evergrance Guangzhou R&F Mongo Football Turf City SISB Thailand  Toyota Thailand

Episodes 

FC Barcelona’s Under 12 team won the 2016 tournament. After beating Omiya 1-0 in the final, The Catalan juniors showed some sportsmanship, taking time to console their distraught opponents. This situation was reported in many countries.

Sponsorship 

 Daiwa House (Special Sponsor)
 Daiwa House Next (Sponsor)
 Daiwa Living (Sponsor)
 Daiwa Lease (Sponsor)
 Cosmos Initia (Sponsor)
 Global Community (Sponsor)
 Daiwa Roynet Hotels (Sponsor)
 Sports Club NAS (Sponsor)
 Cosmos More (Sponsor)
 Nippon Travel Agency (Sub Sponsor)
 Nike, Inc. (Sub Sponsor)
 CP5 (Sub Sponsor)
 Japan Sports Promotion (Partner)
 Tokyo Verdy (Partner)
 SKY PerfecTV! (Media Partner)

References

External links
 Official U-12 Junior Soccer World Challenge

Youth football competitions